Williamsville is an unincorporated community in the town of Newfane in Windham County, Vermont, United States. Baker Brook River passes through the community, which lies in the Green Mountains. Williamsville has its own Volunteer Fire Department, and Postal Office.  The ZIP Code for Williamsville is 05362.

References

Unincorporated communities in Vermont
Unincorporated communities in Windham County, Vermont